Ruel Ross Appleton, Sr. (1853 – February 13, 1928) of Brooklyn was a cotton goods broker and banker.

History
In 1901 he supported Alfred T. White. In 1913 he was the Chairman of the Gaynor Nominating Committee and Chairman of the Gaynor Fusion Nominating League in 1913. Under these titles he worked as the campaign manager for William Jay Gaynor of New York City. He died on February 13, 1928.

References

American bankers
American merchants
1853 births
1928 deaths